Van Dieren or Van Dieren Éditeur is a French Protestant publishing house, Francophone and independent, founded in 1995 and located in Paris. Specializing in Liberal Christianity, this house also publishes art books and literature.

Authors 
 Laurent Gagnebin
 
 Rémi Gounelle
 
 Bernard Reymond
 Friedrich Schleiermacher
 Ernst Troeltsch

External links 
  Van Dieren website

Publishing companies of France
Publishing companies established in 1995